Kumlinge Airfield  is an airfield in Kumlinge, Åland, Finland.

The airfield was opened in 1975, and it is operated by the Government of Åland.

See also
List of airports in Finland

References

External links

 VFR Suomi/Finland – Kumlinge Airfield
 Lentopaikat.net – Kumlinge Airfield 
 Länsmans Vårdhus – Kumlinge airstrip

Airports in Finland
Aviation in Åland
Buildings and structures in Åland